Bonora is a surname. Notable people with the surname include:

Alessandro Bonora (born 1978), Italian cricketer
Camille Bonora (born 1956), American Muppet performer, voice performer and actress
Davide Bonora (born 1973), Italian basketball player
Georgia Bonora, Australian gymnast